G.G. (or Gary Glitter) is the title of Gary Glitter's third studio album, which was released in 1975.

Background
The album was an attempt by Glitter to change his musical direction from the usual heavy glam rock he had been recording. It was produced by Mark Munro, unlike Glitter's previous efforts which were done by Mike Leander. Also unlike his previous albums, Glitter had very little to do with the composing of the songs, having only one credit as a songwriter on "I'll Carry Your Picture (Everywhere)" (it was the B-side of the hit single "Love Like You and Me"). As well as attempting to broaden his style, the album was also an attempt to break Glitter into the music market of the United States. Though Glitter had previously had hits there in 1973 with "Rock and Roll" and "I Didn't Know I Loved You (Til I Saw You Rock 'n' Roll)" and some further minor success with his debut album Glitter, his follow-ups didn't do as well as in other countries. Ironically, the G.G. album (or any singles from it) was never released in the USA.

Back in the United Kingdom, Glitter's homeland, the first single from the album "Papa-Oom-Mow-Mow", stalled outside the top 30. It was his worst chart showing to date, his 11 previous singles all having reached the top 10. The album also performed poorly compared to his previous efforts.

"Satan's Daughter", a track composed for Glitter by Haras Fyre, was scheduled to be the follow-up single to "Papa-Oom-Mow-Mow" in early 1976, However, Glitter's record label were worried about the decline in record sales and the hundreds of unsold tickets at most venues on his current tour. To try to sell tickets (and records) they staged a publicity stunt saying Glitter would be retiring from live performing. As a result, the tour sold out, but they virtually stopped promoting the G.G. album and "Satan's Daughter" was never issued as a single. Instead, Bell Records opted for a 'safer' bet with the disco/rock number "You Belong to Me", which charted that year (this song was not included on the album in question).

Although the G. G. album never charted in the UK, it has since picked up a cult following in ongoing years and eventually reached a world sales figure in the region of 300,000 copies. Over the years it has been available on most major formats, including vinyl, audio tape, CD and 8-track.

2009 Reissue
The album was reissued in 2009 under Airmail Records including three bonus tracks: "Love Like You And Me", "Doing Alright With The Boys" and "She-Cat, Alley Cat".

Track listing

Side One
"Too Late to Put It Down" (Mike Katz) - 2:44
"Satan's Daughter" (Haras Fyre) - 4:01
"Easy Evil" (Alan O'Day) - 3:48
"Baby, I Love Your Way" (Peter Frampton) - 3:45
"Papa-Oom-Mow-Mow" (Al Frazier, Carl White, John Harris, Turner Wilson, Jr.) - 3:45

Side Two
"Finder's Keepers" (Ben Raleigh, Mark Barkan) - 3:31
"Basic Lady" (Allen Toussaint) - 3:38
"Cupid" (Sam Cooke) - 3:18
"I'll Carry Your Picture (Everywhere)" (Gary Glitter, Gerry Shephard) - 2:59
"Personality" (Harold Logan, Lloyd Price) - 3:36

Bonus tracks on 1996 reissue
  "Superhero" 3:47
"I Hate You" 1:40
"It's Alright" 2:44
"Good for No Good" 2:37

Bonus tracks on 2009 reissue
"Love Like You and Me" - 3:19
"Doing Alright with the Boys" - 3:17
"She-Cat, Alley Cat" - 3:24

Personnel
Gary Glitter - vocals
Jeff Mironov, Jerry Friedman, Lance Quinn - guitar
Pat Rebillot, Ricky Williams - keyboards
Jimmy Young - drums
George Devens, Teddy Sommer - percussion
Carlos Martin - congas
Diane Sumler, Luther Vandross, Robin Clark - background vocals
Bert De Coteaux, Joe Renzetti - arrangements
Uncredited - bass

Haras Fyre (pka Patrick Grant) on BMI

References

1975 albums
Gary Glitter albums
Bell Records albums